Ambika Prasad Pandey is an Indian politician from Bharatiya Jan Sangh. He was elected as a member of 6th Lok Sabha from Banda on Bharatiya Jan Sangh ticket. He contested 1974 Uttar Pradesh Legislative Assembly Election on Bharatiya Jan Sangh ticket but lost. He was imprisoned for about 4 months under Defence of India Rules during emergency.

References

1937 births
Year of death missing
India MPs 1977–1979
Bharatiya Jana Sangh politicians
People from Banda district, India
Lok Sabha members from Uttar Pradesh
Janata Party politicians
Bharatiya Lok Dal politicians